Mark Plati is a New York–based musician, record producer, and songwriter, best known for his work in the 1990s with David Bowie. 

Plati also has worked with Spookey Ruben, The Cure, Duncan Sheik, Hooverphonic, Robbie Williams, Joe McIntyre, Dave Navarro, Lou Reed, Fleetwood Mac, Deee-Lite, and Natalie Imbruglia, Sam Moore, Bobbejaan Schoepen. He has also worked in France and Belgium with artists like Kyo, Louise Attaque, les Rita Mitsouko, Alain Bashung, Émilie Simon, Saule, Raphael, Axelle Red.

References

External links
 Official site

American record producers
Living people
Year of birth missing (living people)